Zoran Nikolić (born April 1, 1996) is a Montenegrin professional basketball player for ESSM Le Portel of the French LNB Pro A.

References

External links
 Zoran Nikolić at abaliga.com
 Zoran Nikolić at eurobasket.com
 Zoran Nikolić at euroleague.net

1996 births
Living people
ABA League players
CB Girona players
CB Prat players
Centers (basketball)
ESSM Le Portel players
KK Budućnost players
KK Mega Basket players
Joventut Badalona players
Liga ACB players
Montenegrin expatriate basketball people in Serbia
Montenegrin expatriate basketball people in Spain
Montenegrin men's basketball players
Sportspeople from Nikšić